This page lists all described species of the spider family Atypidae accepted by the World Spider Catalog :

Atypus

Atypus Latreille, 1804
 A. affinis Eichwald, 1830 — Europe (Ireland to Ukraine), North Africa
 A. baotianmanensis Hu, 1994 — China
 A. baotingensis Li, Xu, Zhang, Liu, Zhang & Li, 2018 — China (Hainan)
 A. coreanus Kim, 1985 — Korea
 A. dorsualis Thorell, 1897 — Myanmar, Thailand
 A. flexus Zhu, Zhang, Song & Qu, 2006 — China
 A. formosensis Kayashima, 1943 — Taiwan
 A. heterothecus Zhang, 1985 — China
 A. javanus Thorell, 1890 — Indonesia (Java)
 A. jianfengensis Li, Xu, Zhang, Liu, Zhang & Li, 2018 — China (Hainan)
 A. karschi Dönitz, 1887 — Korea, China, Taiwan, Japan
 A. lannaianus Schwendinger, 1989 — Thailand
 A. largosaccatus Zhu, Zhang, Song & Qu, 2006 — China
 A. ledongensis Zhu, Zhang, Song & Qu, 2006 — China
 A. magnus Namkung, 1986 — Russia (Far East), Korea
 A. medius Oliger, 1999 — Russia (Far East)
 A. minutus Lee, Lee, Yoo & Kim, 2015 — Korea
 A. muralis Bertkau, 1890 — Central Europe to Turkmenistan
 A. pedicellatus Zhu, Zhang, Song & Qu, 2006 — China
 A. piceus (Sulzer, 1776) (type) — Europe (France to Russia), Iran
 A. quelpartensis Namkung, 2002 — Korea
 A. sacculatus Zhu, Zhang, Song & Qu, 2006 — China
 A. seogwipoensis Kim, Ye & Noh, 2015 — Korea
 A. sinensis Schenkel, 1953 — China
 A. snetsingeri Sarno, 1973 — USA
 A. sternosulcus Kim, Kim, Jung & Lee, 2006 — Korea
 A. suiningensis Zhang, 1985 — China
 A. suthepicus Schwendinger, 1989 — Thailand
 A. sutherlandi Chennappaiya, 1935 — India
 A. suwonensis Kim, Kim, Jung & Lee, 2006 — Korea
 A. tibetensis Zhu, Zhang, Song & Qu, 2006 — China
 A. wataribabaorum Tanikawa, 2006 — Japan
 A. wii Siliwal, Kumar & Raven, 2014 — India
 A. yajuni Zhu, Zhang, Song & Qu, 2006 — China
 † A. juvenis Wunderlich, 2011

Calommata

Calommata Lucas, 1837
 C. fulvipes (Lucas, 1835) (type) — Indonesia (Java, Sumatra)
 C. megae Fourie, Haddad & Jocqué, 2011 — Zimbabwe
 C. meridionalis Fourie, Haddad & Jocqué, 2011 — South Africa
 C. namibica Fourie, Haddad & Jocqué, 2011 — Namibia
 C. obesa Simon, 1886 — Thailand
 C. pichoni Schenkel, 1963 — China
 C. signata Karsch, 1879 — China, Korea, Japan
 C. simoni Pocock, 1903 — West, Central, East Africa
 C. sundaica (Doleschall, 1859) — Indonesia (Java, Sumatra), Israel
 C. tamdaoensis Zha, Pham & Li, 2012 — Vietnam
 C. tibialis Fourie, Haddad & Jocqué, 2011 — Ivory Coast, Togo
 C. transvaalica (Hewitt, 1916) — South Africa
 C. truculenta (Thorell, 1887) — Myanmar

Sphodros

Sphodros Walckenaer, 1835
 S. abboti Walckenaer, 1835 (type) — USA
 S. atlanticus Gertsch & Platnick, 1980 — USA
 S. coylei Gertsch & Platnick, 1980 — USA
 S. fitchi Gertsch & Platnick, 1980 — USA
 S. niger (Hentz, 1842) — USA, Canada
 S. paisano Gertsch & Platnick, 1980 — USA, Mexico
 S. rufipes (Latreille, 1829) — USA

References

Atypidae